National sports teams of the United Kingdom is an incomplete list of sports teams representing the United Kingdom. The teams are often referred to as 'Great Britain' as they represent the United Kingdom minus Northern Ireland, the residents of which often able to choose to play for either Ireland or the UK.

Multi-sport events
Great Britain at the Olympics
 Great Britain at the Paralympics
 Great Britain at the European Games
 A1 Team Great Britain

American football
 Great Britain national American football team

Australian football
 Great Britain men's national Australian rules football team
 Great Britain women's national Australian rules football team

Baseball
 Great Britain national baseball team

Basketball
 Great Britain men's national basketball team
 Great Britain women's national basketball team

Football
 United Kingdom national football team
 Great Britain Olympic football team
 Great Britain women's Olympic football team

Field hockey
 Great Britain men's national field hockey team
 Great Britain women's national field hockey team

Handball
 Great Britain men's national handball team
 Great Britain women's national handball team

Ice hockey
 Great Britain men's national ice hockey team
 Great Britain women's national ice hockey team

Korfball
 Great Britain national korfball team

Pitch and Putt
 Great Britain men's national pitch and putt team

Rugby League
 Great Britain national rugby league team
 Great Britain women's national rugby league team

Rugby sevens
 Great Britain national rugby sevens team
 Great Britain women's national rugby sevens team

Rugby Union
 British and Irish Lions
 Great Britain national women's rugby union team

Track racing
 Great Britain national long track team
 Great Britain national speedway team

Tennis
 Great Britain Davis Cup team
 Great Britain Fed Cup team

Underwater Hockey
 Great Britain national underwater hockey team

Volleyball
 Great Britain men's national volleyball team
 Great Britain women's national volleyball team

Water polo
 Great Britain men's national water polo team
 Great Britain women's national water polo team

Wheelchair rugby
 Great Britain national wheelchair rugby team

Wheelchair basketball
 Great Britain men's national wheelchair basketball team
 Great Britain women's national wheelchair basketball team

See also
 Sport in the United Kingdom
 List of national sports teams of England
 List of national sports teams of Scotland

Sport in the United Kingdom
National sports teams of the United Kingdom